El simulacro: por qué el kirchnerismo es reaccionario is a 2013 nonfiction book by Alejandro Katz. It describes the policies of the governments of Néstor Kirchner and Cristina Fernández de Kirchner and the way the government propaganda network describes it.

References

2013 non-fiction books
Argentine political books
Planeta books